Jerome C. Wakefield is a professor of social work in the Silver School of Social Work at New York University. Much of his work is in the history and philosophy of psychiatry. He is noted for his "harmful dysfunction" analysis of mental illness, which he positions between the anti-psychiatry viewpoint of the social construction of mental illness and the conventional view in mainstream psychiatry that such illnesses can be objectively diagnosed based on a set of symptoms. His writings on mental illness have attracted considerable attention, including a 1999 issue of the Journal of Abnormal Psychology that was dedicated to his views on the topic. He was elected a member of the American Academy of Social Work and Social Welfare in 2020.

References

External links
Faculty page

Living people
American social workers
New York University faculty
Queens College, City University of New York alumni
University of California, Berkeley alumni
20th-century American philosophers
21st-century American philosophers
Year of birth missing (living people)